Papilio oxynius, the Cuban black swallowtail, is a species of Neotropical swallowtail butterfly from the genus Papilio that is found in Cuba.

Description
Similar to P. pelaus but the band of the forewing only indicated; the marginal spots of both wings large.

Biology
Larvae feed on Xanthoxylum. Adults are gregarious by day, resting on the trunk and branches.

References

Lewis, H. L., 1974 Butterflies of the World  Page 25, figure 7

External links

Butterflycorner Images from Naturhistorisches Museum Wien

oxynius
Butterflies described in 1827
Papilionidae of South America
Endemic fauna of Cuba